Jane Hathaway may refer to:

 Jane Hathaway (Beverly Hillbillies character), a character in The Beverly Hillbillies
 Jane Hathaway, pseudonym for composer John Stepan Zamecnik
 Jane Hathaway (academic), former president in the Turkish Studies Association